Mohammed Omar Mohammed Ahmed Al-Shaddadi, known as Mohammad Omar (born November 11, 1976 in Dubai, UAE) is a retired  Emirati footballer, serving as the CEO for Mumbai Tigers F.C. in India. He was the captain of the UAE national football team from 2002-2008. During his professional football career which spanned over 20 years he has played for many clubs including Al Wasl, Al Ain, Al Jazira, Al Dhafra, Al-Nasr, and Ajman Club. In Summer 2010, Omar announced that he would move back to the club that he started with, Al Wasl FC to play a final season and retire.  In 2002, he joined Omani club, Dhofar and competed with them in the final of the Sultan Qaboos Cup, and scored the only goal for the team in a game which they eventually lost to neighbor's, Al-Nasr.

Mohammed Omar is the younger brother of the UAE's football legend Zuhair Bakhit.

International goals

Honors

Clubs

Al Wasl FC
 UAE League : UAE Football League 1996–97

Al Ain FC
 UAE League : 2001–02, 2002–03, 2003–04.
 AFC Champions League : 2002–03.
 UAE Super Cup: 2002/2003

International
 Gulf Cup of Nations : 2007 (Champions).

Individual
 UAE League : the second Top goalscorer 2008–09.
 Gulf Cup of Nations as captain.

See also
 List of men's footballers with 100 or more international caps

References

Emirati footballers
Living people
Al Jazira Club players
Al-Wasl F.C. players
Al Ain FC players
Al Dhafra FC players
Ajman Club players
1976 births
Sportspeople from Dubai
FIFA Century Club
UAE Pro League players
Al-Nasr SC (Dubai) players
Association football forwards